Ronald Mayo (born October 11, 1950) is a former American football tight end who played two seasons, for the Houston Oilers and Baltimore Colts. He was drafted in the 6th round (131st overall) of the 1973 NFL Draft by the Houston Oilers. He was claimed by the Green Bay Packers in 1975 but did not play for them.

References

Further reading 

1950 births
Living people
Houston Oilers players
Baltimore Colts players
American football tight ends
Morgan State Bears football players